Kate Claxton  (August 24, 1848 – May 5, 1924) was an American actress.

Biography
Kate Elizabeth Cone was born at Somerville, New Jersey to Spencer Wallace Cone and Josephine Martinez. She made her first appearance on the stage in Chicago with Lotta Crabtree in 1870, and in the same year, joined Augustin Daly's Fifth Avenue Theatre in New York City. In 1872, she became a member of A.M. Palmer's Union Square Theatre, playing largely comedy roles. She created the part of Louise in The Two Orphans and then became known as one of the best emotional actresses of her time. Her first starring tour was in 1876.

She was performing the play The Two Orphans on December 5, 1876, at the Brooklyn Theatre in New York when a fire broke out and killed 278 people.

Claxton first married in 1865 to Isadore Lyon; they later divorced. On March 3, 1878, she married Charles A. Stevenson, and in 1911, they divorced. Her son Harold Stevenson committed suicide in 1904.

Claxton died due to a cerebral hemorrhage in her apartment in New York City; she was buried in Brooklyn's Green-Wood Cemetery.

Claxton, Georgia is said by some local historians to be named for her.

References

Attribution

Bibliography
Ryan, Pat M. "Claxton, Kate" Notable American Women. Vol. 1, 4th ed., The Belknap Press of Harvard University Press, 1975

External links

Kate photo(Wayback Machine)

19th-century American actresses
1848 births
1924 deaths
Burials at Green-Wood Cemetery
Actresses from Somerville, New Jersey
American stage actresses
Screenwriters from New Jersey
20th-century American screenwriters
20th-century American actresses